Gutzwiller is a surname. Notable people with the surname include:

Kathryn Gutzwiller, American classicist
Martin Gutzwiller (1925–2014), Swiss-American physicist